This is a list of football stadiums in Iceland, ordered by capacity (seating only).

See also

Football in Iceland
List of football clubs in Iceland
List of stadiums in the Nordic countries by capacity
List of European stadiums by capacity
List of association football stadiums by capacity

Iceland
stadiums
Football stadium